This is a list of sheriffs of the City of London. Pursuant to a royal charter of Henry I  1131, the liverymen of the City elected two sheriffs of "London and Middlesex" upon payment of £300 per annum to the Crown. This practice continued until 1889, when the Local Government Act 1888 came into force. Thereafter a High Sheriff of Middlesex and a High Sheriff of the County of London were separately appointed in the same manner as other English and Welsh counties.

Sheriffs of London
Sheriffs of London before the 12th century:
 Wolgarius
 Geffrey de Magnum
 Hugh Bock
 William de Eynesford
 1125–1141 Abericus de Vere (killed May 1141)
 Gilbert Beck, Peter Fitz-Walter
 John Fitz-Negelly, Ernulph Buchel

12th century
Sheriffs of London in the 12th century:
,

13th century
Sheriffs of London in the 13th century:

14th century
Sheriffs of London in the 14th century:

15th century
Sheriffs of London in the 15th century:

16th century
Sheriffs of London in the 16th century:

17th century
Sheriffs of London in the 17th century:

18th century

Sheriffs of London in the 18th century:

19th century

Sheriffs of the City of London

19th century

20th century

21st century

See also
 List of Lord Mayors of London

Notes

References
Author,YearComplete Baronetage,Publisher

External links
 Mayors and Sheriffs of London, 1273-1602
 The Aldermen of the City of London, vol. II by Rev Beaven 
 The Mayors and Sheriffs of London database from University of Toronto

Sheriff
 
People from the City of London
Sheriffs